Ariel Gade (born c. 1996) is an American former child actress from San Jose, California.  She made her first acting appearance on an episode of television's Strong Medicine, and followed this with a performance in the Barry Levinson film Envy (2004).

Career
Gade's second film role was as Ceci in Dark Water (2005). She acquired the role of Rose on Shaun Cassidy’s Invasion in 2005. Gade made a guest appearance on The Tonight Show with Jay Leno in July 2005. She retired her acting career in 2011, in order to focus on school and family.

Filmography

References

External links
 
 Ariel Gade's biography on filmbug

1990s births
Living people
21st-century American actresses
Actresses from San Jose, California
American child actresses
American film actresses
American television actresses
Year of birth missing (living people)